Sholing Sports were a long running Southampton based football team who for many years played with great success in the Hampshire and Wessex League's. They folded in 1994 after suddenly losing their ground.

History
It is thought that the club were founded in 1901 as Sholing Athletic and spent their early days playing in the Southampton League. In 1919–20 Sholing won the Senior League title and the first of three successive Southampton Senior Cups. This saw them step up into the Hampshire League where they promptly won the East Division title. Playing in the County Division (later to become Division 1) Sholing soon settled and after finishing 6th and 5th they proudly won the Hampshire Senior Cup but after two tough seasons the club finished bottom and returned to the less demanding Southampton League.

Now known as simply Sholing the club soon re-established themselves as a force. The late Thirties were particularly successful times - in 1937–38 they were Senior League champions and Hampshire Intermediate Cup winners, the following season saw them retain the title and win the Southampton Senior Cup.

After World War II the club became known as Sholing Sports and returned to the Hampshire League in 1946 when they were placed in Division 3 East. Back in county football, Sholing quickly settled and shortly after moving to their Birch Lawn home, they won promotion as champions in 1952–53 before consolidating themselves in Division 2. After some promising seasons, Sholing were promoted to Division 1 in 1961-62 but struggled and dropped straight back down again, and were surprisingly relegated back to Division 3 in 1964–65. 

The 1970s saw Sholing Sports become a prominent force in the Hampshire League. In 1969-70 they were Division 3 East champions and in 1971–72 they finished runners-up in Division 2, winning promotion back to the top flight - and this time they were far better prepared. Sholing quickly became one of the top clubs in the league and began entering the national competitions, the FA Cup and FA Vase. They enjoyed several good runs in the latter competition. In 1973–74 Sholing won their first Division 1 title as well as the Hampshire Senior Cup. 

The club remained regular title contenders, finishing runners-up three times before the incredible 1982–83 season when they were deservedly League champions - and they completed a remarkable treble by also winning the Hampshire Senior and Russell Cotes Cup's. The following season saw Sholing retain the league title, but were beaten finalists in the Hampshire Senior Cup. In 1984-85, Sholing were league runners-up and Hampshire Senior Cup finalists, but did gain some compensation when they again won the Russell Cotes Cup.

For the 1986-87 campaign Sholing Sports became founder members of the newly formed Wessex League, and enjoyed a steady debut season in which they finished a creditable 9th. However, they excelled in that season's cup competitions, reaching the finals of the Southampton Senior, Russell Cotes and the inaugural Wessex League Cup - unfortunately losing all three. The next few years saw the club continue to hold their own but in a more professional environment their fortunes gradually declined - not helped in the early 1990s by increasing uncertainty over their Birch Lawn ground, caused mainly by financial problems at the adjacent Social Club. 

Sholing Sports battled on until August 1993 when they were evicted from their ground - virtually on the eve of the new season and inevitably this unfortunately forced them to withdraw from the competition. The club continued to operate during the 1993-94 season with just an Under 18's side playing in the Hampshire Youth League but the search for a new home ground was unsuccessful and they inevitably folded.

Honours

Hampshire League Division 1
Champions 1973/74, 1982/83 and 1983/84
Runners-up 1974/75, 1975/76, 1981/82 and 1984/85
Hampshire League Division 2
Runners-up 1970/71
Hampshire League East Division
Champions 1920/21
Hampshire League Division 3 East
Champions 1952/53 and 1969/70
Runners-up 1950/51 and 1968/69

Southampton League Senior Division
Champions 1919/20, 1920/21, 1937/38 and 1938/39
Southampton League Junior 'A' Division
Champions 1913/14
Hampshire FA Senior Cup 
Winners 1922/23, 1973/74 and 1982/83
Finalists 1983/84 and 1984/85

Hampshire FA Intermediate Cup
Winners 1937/38 
Hampshire FA Russell Cotes Cup
Winners 1971/72, 1982/83 and 1984/85
Finalists 1986/87

Southampton FA Senior Cup
Winners 1919/20, 1920/21, 1921/22, 1938/39, 1961/62 and 1979/80
Finalists 1986/87
Wessex League Cup
Finalists 1986/87

Playing Records

League

FA Cup

FA Vase

Successor Clubs

In 2005 the famous name was revived by some enthusiastic locals and the new Sholing Sports joined the Southampton League. Like their predecessors, they originally played at Mayfield Park and began clawing their way up through the Junior ranks. By 2009 they had reached the Senior section and were using the Royal Victoria Country Park in Netley for their home matches, but sadly after a tough 2010-11 season the club again ceased to exist.

In 2010, successful local rivals VTFC (Vosper Thornycroft) changed their name to Sholing FC in a bid to attract more local support but they are not connected in any way to Sholing Sports, who remain consigned to the history books and sorely missed.

Famous Players

Over the years many fine players appeared for Sholing Sports. In the early twenties two players moved on to professional clubs; Tom Parker who progressed on to Southampton and the legendary Arsenal team of the thirties and also Sam Meston, who played for Southampton, Gillingham and Everton. Latterly, they had two former professionals as player-managers - Jack Gregory (former Southampton, Bournemouth and Leyton Orient) for the 1965-66 season, and also Tommy Hare (former Southampton and Luton Town) for the 1976-77 campaign.

References

Defunct football clubs in England
Association football clubs established in 1901
Association football clubs disestablished in 1994
1901 establishments in England
1994 disestablishments in England
2005 establishments in England
Association football clubs established in 2005
Association football clubs disestablished in 2011
2011 disestablishments in England
Defunct football clubs in Hampshire